Deacon John Farrington was a member of the Great and General Court of Massachusetts. He died September 30, 1843. He was a descendant of John Farrington, one of the original settlers of Dedham, Wrentham, and Deerfield, Massachusetts.

References

Members of the Massachusetts General Court
Year of birth missing
1843 deaths